The 2000 AFL Women's National Championships took place in Melbourne, Victoria, Australia. The tournament began on 29 June and ended on 4 July 2000. The 2000 tournament was the ninth Championship. The Senior-vics of Victoria won the 2000 Championship, defeating Western Australia in the final. It was Victoria's ninth consecutive title.

Ladder
  Victoria-Senior
  Western Australia
  Queensland
  Australian Capital Territory
  Northern Territory
  Australian Capital Territory
  South Australia
  New South Wales

External links
National Results from the AFL site

2000
2000 in Australian rules football
AFL